USS Maumee or USNS Maumee has been the name of four ships in the United States Navy.  These ships are named for the Maumee River, which flows from Indiana through Ohio to empty into Lake Erie at Toledo.

 , a 593-ton screw steam gunboat in commission from 1864 to 1865
 , an oiler in commission from 1916 to 1922 and from 1942 to 1946
 , a collier commissioned in 1918
 , a U.S. Navy fleet oiler in non-commissioned service with the Military Sea Transportation Service and Military Sealift Command from 1956 until the 1980s.

See also
 

United States Navy ship names